Ambidextrous: The Secret Lives of Children is a 1985 novel by American author Felice Picano. The book is a semi-autobiographical account of the author's life growing up in the 1950s. Major themes include adolescent sexuality and coming out.

A "bold, funny and excruciatingly honest" biographic tale of the author's own childhood and coming out experience, that inevitably affects the reader's retrospective view of his own childhood memories.

When it was first published, the novel was perceived as so scandalous in Great Britain that it was burned on arrival directly at the Liverpool docks. Still, or perhaps because of its reception upon release, the book has received classical status and has been re-released on more than one occasion, the latest release being in 2003.

References 

1985 American novels
American LGBT novels
Novels set in the 1950s
1980s LGBT novels